The 7th Independent Spirit Awards, honoring the best in independent filmmaking for 1991, were announced on March 28, 1992. It was hosted by Buck Henry in a large tent at Raleigh Studios.

Winners and nominees

Presenters
Danny Aiello, Jacqueline Bisset, Sofia Coppola, Johnny Depp, Larry Fishburne, John Glover, Anthony Hopkins, Liam Neeson, Joe Mantegna, Lou Diamond Phillips, Brad Pitt, Beata Pozniak, Mimi Rogers, Michael Rooker, Theresa Russell, James Spader, Lily Tomlin, Mario Van Peebles, and JoBeth Williams

Films with multiple nominations and awards

Films that received multiple nominations

Films that won multiple awards

References

External links
 Full ceremony on YouTube
 1991 Spirit Awards at IMDb

1991
Independent Spirit Awards